Frank Watson (15 November 1898 – 27 September 1972) was an English professional football forward who played in the Football League for Blackpool and Brentford.

Career statistics

References

1898 births
1972 deaths
Footballers from Nottingham
English footballers
Association football forwards
Aston Villa F.C. players
Blackpool F.C. players
Leeds United F.C. players
Brentford F.C. players
Southend United F.C. players
Grantham Town F.C. players
Crewe Alexandra F.C. players
Mansfield Town F.C. players
English Football League players
Midland Football League players
Ilkeston United F.C. players